Christopher Robert Kavanaugh (born 1980) is an American lawyer who is the United States Attorney for the Western District of Virginia.

Education

Kavanaugh received his Bachelor of Engineering from Georgia Tech in 2002 and a Juris Doctor from the University of Virginia School of Law in 2006.

Career

Kavanaugh was a law clerk for Judge James C. Cacheris of the United States District Court for the Eastern District of Virginia from 2006 to 2007. From 2007 to 2014, Kavanaugh was an Assistant United States Attorney in the United States Attorney's Office for the District of Columbia.

Kavanaugh served as an assistant U.S. attorney for the Western District of Virginia from 2014 to 2021. In this role, he was the chief national security prosecutor, senior litigation counsel, and counsel to the United States attorney for the Western District of Virginia. He has served as senior counsel for the United States deputy attorney general.. Since 2011, he has been an adjunct professor at the University of Virginia School of Law, where he teaches federal criminal practice and trial advocacy.

U.S. attorney for the Western District of Virginia 

In March 2021, Senators Tim Kaine and Mark Warner recommended Kavanaugh and one other candidate to the White House. On August 10, 2021, President Joe Biden nominated Kavanaugh to be the United States attorney for the Western District of Virginia. On September 30, 2021, his nomination was reported out of committee by voice vote. On October 5, 2021, his nomination was confirmed in the United States Senate by voice vote. On the evening of October 7, 2021, he was sworn into office by deputy attorney general Lisa Monaco.

References

1980 births
Living people
21st-century American engineers
21st-century American lawyers
Assistant United States Attorneys
Georgia Tech alumni
People from Gastonia, North Carolina
United States Attorneys for the Western District of Virginia
United States Department of Justice lawyers
University of Virginia School of Law alumni